The Fazl-e-Omar Mosque in Hamburg is the second purpose-built mosque in Germany. The mosque is named after the Second Caliph Mirza Basheer-ud-Din Mahmood Ahmad and is located at the street of Wieckstraße in Eimsbüttel, Hamburg. It is run by the Ahmadiyya Muslim Community (AMJ) and was inaugurated on July 22, 1957, by Sir Muhammad Zafarullah Khan. The foundation stone was laid on February 22, 1957.

See also 
Islam in Germany
Ahmadiyya
List of mosques in Europe

References

Ahmadiyya mosques in Germany
Mosques completed in 1957
Mosques in Hamburg
Buildings and structures in Eimsbüttel